Robert Dean Logan (February 10, 1910 – May 20, 1978) was a pitcher in Major League Baseball. The native of Thompson, Nebraska, made his professional baseball debut in 1930 with the Class D Fairbury Jeffersons of the Nebraska State League. He pitched for the Brooklyn Dodgers, Detroit Tigers, Chicago Cubs, Cincinnati Reds, and Boston Braves of Major League Baseball (MLB) between 1935 and 1945. His last professional action came in 1946 when he pitched for the Class AAA Indianapolis Indians of the American Association. He died in Indianapolis, Indiana in 1978.

References

External links

1910 births
1978 deaths
Baseball players from Nebraska
Major League Baseball pitchers
Brooklyn Dodgers players
Detroit Tigers players
Chicago Cubs players
Boston Braves players
Fairbury Jeffersons players
Indianapolis Indians players
Oklahoma City Indians players
Knoxville Smokies players
People from Jefferson County, Nebraska